is a 2008 Japanese film written, directed and edited by Takeshi Kitano. The film is the third and final part of Kitano's surrealist autobiographical trilogy, starting with Takeshis' and continuing with Glory to the Filmmaker!

The title Achilles and the Tortoise refers to the motion paradox by Greek philosopher Zeno of Elea, Achilles and the Tortoise.

Plot
Kitano plays Machisu, who is born into a wealthy family, but loses both his parents as a child. When his father (Akira Nakao) commits suicide after the collapse of his business, Machisu's stepmother (Mariko Tsutsui) sends him to live with an aunt and uncle who mistreat him and finally send him to an orphanage. As a young man, Machisu  (Yurei Yanagi) attends art school and finds his style of painting challenged by the more experimental and conceptual work turned in by his classmates. Machisu takes a job in order to pay for art school, and strikes up a friendship with a fellow co-worker, Sachiko (Kumiko Asō), who seems to grasp his artistic vision. They get married and have a daughter. As he grows older, Mashisu's obsession with contemporary art controls his whole life, leaving him insensitive of everything around him, including the death of his own daughter (Eri Tokunaga) and his wife's desertion. He tries to please the art critics, remaining penniless. He is caught up in a fire and almost dies. Losing all his previous works, he is left with a single half-burnt soda can, which he assesses at 200,000 yen and tries to sell. This ends up kicked carelessly away when his wife picks him up from the street. They walk away together, seemingly finally rid of his artistic obsession.

Cast
 Beat Takeshi as Machisu
 Kanako Higuchi as Sachiko
 Yurei Yanagi as Young Machisu
 Kumiko Asō as Young Sachiko
 Akira Nakao as Machisu's father
 Mariko Tsutsui as Machisu's stepmother
 Ren Osugi as Machisu's uncle
 Susumu Terajima as Yakuza pimp
 Eri Tokunaga as Machisu's daughter
 Nao Omori as Art dealer
 Masato Ibu as Art dealer

Release
The film premiered in competition at the 65th Venice Film Festival on August 28, 2008.

Reception
Mark Schilling of The Japan Times gave the film 2 out of 5 stars.

Further reading

References

External links
  
 

Films directed by Takeshi Kitano
Films scored by Yuki Kajiura
2008 films
2008 comedy-drama films
2000s Japanese-language films
Yakuza films
Japanese comedy-drama films
2000s Japanese films